Dugu may refer to:

Dugu ceremony, a funerary ceremony practiced by the Garifuna people
Dugu (surname), a Chinese surname of Xianbei/Xiongnu origin
Dugu, Hebei, a town in Xinle, Hebei, China
Dugu Miniautotoys, Italian diecast model maker

See also
Dagu (disambiguation)
Degu (disambiguation)
Dogu (disambiguation)